Thomas James Moores (born 4 September 1996) is an English cricketer who plays for Nottinghamshire. He is a left-handed batsman who also plays as a wicket-keeper.

Domestic and franchise career 
On 21 June 2016, Moores joined Lancashire on loan from Nottinghamshire, after regular wicket-keepers Jos Buttler and Alex Davies were unavailable. He made his Twenty20 debut for Lancashire, on 24 June 2016, against Worcestershire. He was signed by Multan Sultans for the Pakistan Super League 2018/19 season. He had a disappointing spell in the PSL, scoring just 10 runs in 3 matches. He played for Jaffna Stallions in the 2020/21 Lanka Premier League. He had a frustrated spell and played 5 matches in the Lanka Premier League, scoring 61 runs in total.

In December 2021, he was signed by Kandy Warriors to replace Devon Thomas for the remainder of the 2021 campaign.

He was drafted by Trent Rockets for the inaugural season of The Hundred. In April 2022, he was bought by the Trent Rockets for the 2022 season of The Hundred.

References

External links

1996 births
Living people
English cricketers
Nottinghamshire cricketers
Lancashire cricketers
Multan Sultans cricketers
Jaffna Kings cricketers
Kandy Falcons cricketers
Trent Rockets cricketers
Wicket-keepers